Walter of Brienne may refer to:

Walter I of Brienne (c. 1090)
Walter II of Brienne (1120-1161)
Walter III of Brienne (d. 1205)
Walter IV of Brienne (1205-1244)
Walter V of Brienne (1275-1311)
Walter VI of Brienne (1304-1356)
 Walter VII of Brienne (d. 1381), better known as Walter IV of Enghien

See also
 County of Brienne